Vogue México & Latin America is a Mexican fashion magazine and the Latin American edition of Vogue magazine, it is published by Condé Nast de México in Mexico as Vogue Mexico and in the US and the rest of Hispanic American countries as Vogue Latin America.

Vogue Mexico was first released in the 1980s and suspended in the 1990s. In 1999 it was released again as Vogue and Latin America and became the thirteenth edition of Vogue when its first issue was released for October 1999. It is published in Mexico and 12 countries in Latin America like Peru or Argentina, except for Brazil.

History 
Vogue  & Latin America was known as Vogue En Español (Vogue in Spanish) since the first issue was released for October 1999.

2002-2012: Eva Hughes as editor 
Eva Hughes became the editor-in-chief for the magazine in September 2002. Under her leadership, circulation doubled. In 2012 she was named CEO for Condé Nast Mexico and Latin America and stepped down as editor for the magazine.

2012-2016: Kelly Talamas as editor 
Kelly Talamas joined Vogue Mexico in 2007 as editorial coordinator, then she was named fashion editor, and by the end of 2012 she was appointed as editor-in-chief for the magazine after Hughes' departure. She was responsible for the creation of Who's On Next?, which spotlit new and local regional designers. In 2016, she was appointed as Creative Director for Condé Nast Mexico and Latin America.

2016-present: Karla Martínez as editor 
Karla Martínez was appointed as editor-in-chief for the magazine in June 2016, after Talamas was named creative director. Martínez served as associate editor, previous to the promotion.

References 

Fashion magazines
 Latinoamérica